Ania Said Chaurembo is a former member of Parliament in the National Assembly of Tanzania, representing the Civic United Front party.

Sources

External links
 Parliament of Tanzania website

Living people
Members of the National Assembly (Tanzania)
Year of birth missing (living people)
Place of birth missing (living people)